Robert Mallios Galić (1 January 1905 – ?), known as "Mallios" in short, was a Greek footballer who played as a defender and a later manager.

Club career

Mallios started his career at Hefestos Constantinople in 1923. In 1928 he traveled to Greece, where he was transferred to AEK Athens and competed as an expatriate. He was one of the defensive pillars of the club and in 1931 he won the first Greek Cup, that was also the first title of the club, defeating Aris with a score of 5–3.

On 27 September 1933 he went to Cyprus to join Enosis Neon Trust for a season, where he was their captain and manager. He won both the first Cypriot Championship and the first two Cypriot Cups, being the first team to achieve a domestic double in Cypriot football. He ended his playing career in 1936, at the age of 31.

International career
Mallios played 12 times with the Greece and scored 1 goal, between 1930 and 1933, where he also was their captain at instances. His debut took place on 2 March 1930 in an away friendly match against Italy B. On 13 December 1931, he scored his only goal in the blue and white shirt when he opened the score with a well-placed penalty in a home friendly 2–4 defeat against Hungary B. He became the first footballer of AEK Athens to score a goal with the national team.

Managerial career
After Mallios left Enosis Neon Trust he coached Lefkoşa Türk Spor Kulübü for a season and in 1937 he took over at Pezoporikos until 1940, which was the last stop of his career.

Honours

As a player

AEK Athens
Greek Cup: 1931–32

As a player-coach

Enosis Neon Trust
Cypriot First Division: 1934–35 Cypriot First Division
Cypriot Cup: 1934–35 Cypriot Cup, 1935–36 Cypriot Cup

References

External links

1905 births

Year of death missing
Greek footballers
Greece international footballers
Association football defenders
AEK Athens F.C. players
Pezoporikos Larnaca managers
Constantinopolitan Greeks
Turkish expatriate football managers
Footballers from Istanbul
Turkish people of Greek descent
Expatriate footballers in Cyprus